Miamisburg City Schools is the school district serving Miamisburg and Miami Township, Ohio. Miamisburg City Schools has an enrollment of over 5000 students whose education takes place in a single primary school, six elementary schools (grades K-5), one middle school (grades 6–8), and one high school with an enrollment of over 1600 students.

For the 2008–09 school year, the Ohio Department of Education rated Miamisburg City Schools as "Excellent".  Miamisburg scored 99 out of 120 possible "performance index" points, and met 27 of 30 key educational indicators.

Current construction
Various construction projects totalling $79.5 million are underway throughout the district including:
Major expansion and renovation of Miamisburg High School on Belvo Road for 2000 students (anticipated completion summer 2016)
Construction of the new Miamisburg Middle School on Miamisburg-Springboro Road for 1500 students serving grades 6-8 (COMPLETED summer 2011)
Construction of Dr. Jane Chance Elementary School on Wood Road for 550 students (COMPLETED summer 2010)
Historic renovation and major expansion of Kinder Elementary Schools to create a new 550-student, K-5 facility for downtown Miamisburg students (anticipated completion summer 2012)
Security vestibule construction at Bauer Elementary, Bear Elementary, Mound Elementary and Mark Twain Elementary elementaries (COMPLETED summer 2008 and summer 2009 [Bauer])
Extensive renovations to the Harmon Field football stadium (COMPLETED summer 2009)
Significant expansion of the Transportation Center parking lot (COMPLETED summer 2009)

Schools

High schools
Miamisburg High School (1972)

Middle schools
Miamisburg Middle School (2011)

Elementary schools
Bauer Elementary (1967)
Bear Elementary (1956)
Jane Chance Elementary School (2010)
Kinder Elementary (1906)
Mark Twain Elementary (1950)
Medlar View Elementary (1999)
Mound Elementary (1955)

Primary schools
 Maddux-Lang Primary (2008)

See also
 List of school districts in Ohio

References

External links
Miamisburg City Schools website

School districts in Ohio
Miamisburg, Ohio
Education in Montgomery County, Ohio